Cula may refer to:

People
 Cula Naga of Anuradhapura
 Penny Cula-Reid (born 1988), Australian Australian rules football player
 Slaviša Čula (born 1968), Serbian football player

Other
 Culă, Romanian semi-fortified building
 Cúla4, Irish TV channel
 CULA, fictitious university in Legally Blonde